Cooke is a surname derived from the occupation of cook. Notable people with the surname include:

 Alexander Cooke (died 1614), English actor
 Alfred Tyrone Cooke, of the Indo-Pakistani wars
 Alistair Cooke KBE (1908–2004), British-American journalist and broadcaster
 Amos Starr Cooke (1810–1871), found of Royal School and Castle & Cooke in Hawaii
 Anna Rice Cooke (1853–1934), patron of the arts and founder of the Honolulu Academy of Arts
 Anthony Cooke (1505–1576), British scholar
 Baden Cooke (born 1978), Australian cyclist
 Barrie Cooke (1931–2014), Irish painter
 Bates Cooke, US Representative 1831–1833, and NY State Comptroller 1839–1841
 Benjamin Cooke (1734–1793), British musician
 Beryl Cooke (1906–2001), British actress
 C. R. Cooke (Conrad Reginald Cooke, 1901–1996), English early Himalayan mountaineer
 Charles Cooke (disambiguation), several people
 Chauncey H. Cooke (1846–1919), American soldier in the U.S. Civil War
 Christian Cooke (born 1986), English actor
 Clarence Hyde Cooke (1876–1944), businessman in Hawaii
 Dave Cooke, Canadian politician
 Denise D'Ascenzo Cooke (19582019), American news anchor
Derek Cooke (born 1991), basketball player for Hapoel Gilboa Galil of the Israeli Basketball Premier League
 Deryck Cooke (1919–1975), British musicologist
 Doc Cook (Charles L. Cooke, 1891–1958), American jazz bandleader
 Dusty Cooke (1907–1987), American professional baseball player
 Edmund F. Cooke (1885–1967), US congressman from New York
 Edward William Cooke (1811–1880), English maritime artist
 Eric Edgar Cooke, Australian murderer
 Francis Cooke, Passenger on the Mayflower
 Francis Judd Cooke (1910–1995), American composer
 Geoff Cooke (disambiguation), several people
 George Cooke (disambiguation), several people
 H. Basil S. Cooke (1915–2018), Canadian paleontologist
 Hope Cooke, Queen of Sikkim
 Jack Kent Cooke (1912–1997), Canadian entrepreneur
 Sir James Douglas Cooke (1879–1949), MP for Hammersmith South
 James J. Cooke, American historian, author, academic and soldier
 James W. Cooke, American naval officer
 Janet Cooke (born 1954), American journalist, won a Pulitzer Prize for a fabricated story
 Jay Cooke (1821–1905), American financier, notable for financing Union effort in Civil War and Northern Pacific Railway
 Jennifer Cooke, actress
 John Cooke (disambiguation), several people
 John William Cooke (1919–1968), Argentine politician and revolutionary
 Joseph Platt Cooke (1730–1816), in American Revolutionary War
 Keith Cooke, actor
 L. J. Cooke (Louis Joseph Cooke, 1868–1943), first men's basketball coach at the University of Minnesota
 Lawrence H. Cooke (1914–2000), Chief Judge of New York Court of Appeals 1979–1984
 Logan Cooke (born 1995), American football player
 Lorrin A. Cooke (1831–1902), American politician, governor of Connecticut
 Marcia G. Cooke (1954-2023), American jurist
 Martin Cooke (disambiguation), several people
 Matt Cooke, hockey player
 Mel Cooke (1934–2013), New Zealand rugby league footballer
 Mildred Cooke (1524-1589) - was an English noblewoman and translator.
 Mordecai Cubitt Cooke (1825–1914), British botanist
 Nathaniel Cooke (19th century), designer of the standard set of chess figures
 Nelson Cooke (1919–2018), Australian cellist
 Nicole Cooke (born 1983), British cyclist
 Peter Cooke (Scouting)
 Philip St. George Cooke (1809–1895), 19th century US cavalry officer
 Pinny Cooke (1923–2004), New York politician, assemblywoman from Rochester
 Robin Cooke, Baron Cooke of Thorndon, New Zealand judge
 Rose Terry Cooke (1827–1892), American author, poet
Ross Cooke (born 1988), English professional wrestler
 Sam Cooke (1931–1964), American singer/songwriter
 Sir Samuel Cooke (1912–1978), British judge
 Samuel Nathaniel Cooke (S. N. Cooke) (1883–1964), English architect
 Sarah Cooke (died 1688), English actress
 Sasha Cooke, American mezzo-soprano
 Sidney Cooke (born 1927), paedophile and child killer
 Steve Cooke (born 1970), baseball player
 Terence Cooke (1921–1983), Cardinal, and Archbishop of New York
 Thomas Cooke (disambiguation), several people
 Trish Cooke (born 1962), children's TV presenter, author and playwright 
 Walter E. Cooke (1910–1982), New York politician
 Walter H. Cooke (1838–1909), American recipient of the Medal of Honor
 Weldon B. Cooke (1884–1914), American pioneer aviator killed in crash
 Wells Cooke (1858–1916), American ornithologist
 William Cooke (disambiguation), several people
 Wilson Cooke (1819 –1887), American politician and merchant

See also 
 Cook (disambiguation)

References 

English-language surnames
Occupational surnames
English-language occupational surnames